This is a list of seasons of Major League Baseball.

1870s

1880s

1890s

1900s

1910s

1920s

1930s

1940s

1950s

1960s

1970s

1980s

1990s

2000s

2010s

2020s

 
Season